Gerd Krusche (born 5 May 1955) is an Austrian politician who has been a Member of the Federal Council for the Freedom Party of Austria (FPÖ) since 2010.

References

1955 births
Living people
Members of the Federal Council (Austria)
Freedom Party of Austria politicians